Gokhunga is a village in Arghakhanchi District in the Lumbini Zone of southern Nepal. At the time of the 1991 Nepal census, the village had a population of 2918 living in 605 houses. At the time of the 2001 Nepal census, the population was 3358, of which 49% was literate.

References

Populated places in Arghakhanchi District